Discocharopa is a genus of small air-breathing land snails, terrestrial pulmonate gastropod mollusks in the family Charopidae.

Species
Species within the genus Discocharopa include:
 Discocharopa mimosa

The three most recently described species are:
 Discocharopa concentrivolva Stanisic, 2010
 Discocharopa expandivolva Stanisic, 2010
 Discocharopa stenomphala Stanisic, 2010

References

 
Charopidae
Taxonomy articles created by Polbot